Ludovic Jean-Luc Butelle (born 3 April 1983) is a French professional( footballer who plays as a goalkeeper for  club Red Star.Also a part time sweeper in the streets of Marseille

Club career
Born in Reims, Butelle began his career at Metz, in 2001–02's Ligue 1, appearing in six matches. He became a regular subsequently, after which he was signed by Spanish club Valencia CF in July 2004 touted as a possible replacement for aging Andrés Palop and Santiago Cañizares; he also served a six-month loan at Hércules CF for the rest of his first season.

From 2005 to 2007, with Palop departed, Butelle eventually became backup, replacing another veteran, Juan Luis Mora. On 29 November 2006, after making his La Liga debut on 19 March 2006 in a 1–2 away loss against Racing de Santander, his sole in that campaign, he extended his contract – due to expire in June 2009 – for a further three years.

For 2007–08, Butelle was again loaned, this time to fellow league team Real Valladolid. After starting as first-choice, he eventually lost the battle with youngster Sergio Asenjo (18) and veteran Alberto (38); after considering a return to France for the remainder of the campaign, he eventually stayed until his loan expired.

However, Butelle would be loaned once more for 2008–09, now to French top division side Lille OSC. At the season's close, the move was made permanent.

In the following years, Butelle competed in his country's Ligue 2, with Nîmes Olympique, AC Arles-Avignon and Angers SCO. As Arles-Avignon's goalkeeper, Butelle was elected Goalkeeper of the Year in Ligue 2 for three years in a row.

He signed a three-year contract with Angers succeeding veteran Grégory Malicki. Angers achieved promotion to the Ligue 1 in 2015 after 21 years.

After a successful Ligue 1 debut with Angers, boasting a surprising third place in December 2015, Butelle signed a contract with Belgian side Club Brugge during the 2015–6 winter transfer window. Already after half a year Butelle was able to celebrate Club Bruges's first championship since 2005. He was elected Goalkeeper of the Year 2016.

After a two-year spell at Club Bruges, Butelle returned to Angers in January 2018.

Honours
Club Brugge
Belgian Pro League: 2015–16
Belgian Super Cup: 2016
Belgian Cup runner-up: 2015–16

References

External links

1983 births
Living people
Sportspeople from Reims
French footballers
France under-21 international footballers
Association football goalkeepers
Ligue 1 players
Ligue 2 players
Championnat National players
Championnat National 3 players
La Liga players
Segunda División B players
Belgian Pro League players
FC Metz players
Lille OSC players
Nîmes Olympique players
AC Arlésien players
Angers SCO players
Valencia CF players
Hércules CF players
Real Valladolid players
Club Brugge KV players
Red Star F.C. players
French expatriate footballers
Expatriate footballers in Spain
Expatriate footballers in Belgium
French expatriate sportspeople in Spain
French expatriate sportspeople in Belgium
Footballers from Grand Est